The Munster Junior Cup is a  rugby union competition played in the province of Munster, Ireland. The competition was established for the stronger junior clubs and the second teams of the Senior clubs in the province of Munster. The current champions are Young Munster, captained by Shane O'Brien in 2022, a custodian of the game. The competition has traditionally been dominated by senior clubs.

Top Winners

Past winners
 1909 Crescent College F.C.
 1910 Garryowen
 1911 Young Munster
 1912 Limerick City Gaulies
 1913 Dolphin
 1914 Shannon
 1915 Suspended
 1916 Suspended
 1917 Suspended
 1918 Suspended
 1919 Suspended

1920s
 1920 Shannon
 1921 UCC
 1922 Young Munster
 1923 Dolphin
 1924 Shannon
 1925 Shannon
 1926 Dolphin
 1927 Young Munster
 1928 Waterford City
 1929 Presentation

1930s
 1930 Waterford City
 1931 Nenagh Ormond
 1932 Bohemians beat Cork Constitution
 1933 UCC
 1934 Tralee
 1935 Nenagh Ormond beat Killorglin.
 1936 Richmond beat Cork Constitution
 1937 Highfield
 1938 Waterpark Old Boys
 1939 Shannon

1940s
 1940 Shannon
 1941 Castleisland/Waterpark
 1942 Highfield
 1943 Richmond
 1944 Dolphin beat Presentation
 1945 Highfield
 1946 Richmond
 1947 Clanwilliam
 1948 Nenagh Ormond
 1949 Cork Constitution

1950s
 1950 UCC
 1951 Cork Constitution beat Old Crescent
 1952 Richmond
 1953 UCC
 1954 Shannon beat Cashel
 1955 Garryowen
 1956 Cork Constitution beat Old Crescent
 1957 Cork Constitution 
 1958 Cork Constitution
 1959 Young Munster

1960s
 1960 Young Munster
 1961 Shannon beat Nenagh Ormond
 1962 Shannon beat Nenagh Ormond
 1963 UCC beat Young Munster
 1964 Abbeyfeale beat Nenagh Ormond
 1965 Old Christians beat Abbeyfeale
 1966 Abbeyfeale beat Nenagh Ormond
 1967 UCC beat Cashel
 1968 St. Mary's beat Waterford City
 1969 UCC beat Ennis RFC

1970s
 1970 Garryowen
 1971 Thomond beat Garryowen
 1972 Highfield beat UCC
 1973 Cork Constitution beat Bandon
 1974 Waterpark
 1975 UCC beat Tralee
 1976 Garryowen beat Highfield
 1977 UCC beat Cashel
 1978 Garryowen - Midleton 17–15
 1979 UCC beat Richmond

1980s
 1980 Thomond beat UCC 15–9
 1981 Thomond beat UCC 7–6
 1982 Cork Constitution beat Shannon 43–7
 1983 Cork Constitution beat Old Christians 9–6
 1984 Young Munster beat Thomond 15–3
 1985 Thomond beat Cork Constitution 18–9
 1986 Cork Constitution beat Young Munster 9–6
 1987 Cork Constitution beat Highfield 21–0
 1988 Cork Constitution beat Garryowen 9–4
 1989 Thomond beat St. Mary's 6–4

1990s
 1990 Thomond beat Richmond 16–9
 1991 Thomond beat Garryowen 19–15
 1992 Cork Constitution beat Bandon 13–3
 1993 Garryowen beat Shannon 16–11
 1994 Cork Constitution beat Shannon 13–9
 1995 Cork Constitution beat Shannon 17–3
 1996 Shannon beat UCC 19–17
 1997 Midleton beat Cork Constitution 8–3
 1998 Midleton beat Cork Constitution 8–3
 1999 Young Munster beat Kilfeacle 19–13

2000s
 2000 Nenagh Ormond beat Kilfeacle
 2001 Clonakilty beat Cobh Pirates
 2002 Kilfeacle beat Crosshaven
 2003 Cork Constitution beat Nenagh Ormond 23–13
 2004 Nenagh Ormond beat Bruff
 2005 Cork Constitution beat UCC 17–5
 2006 Cobh Pirates beat Cork Constitution 6–5
 2007 Garryowen beat UL Bohemians
 2008 Cork Constitution defeated UCC 17–10
 2009 UL Bohemians beat Garryowen 16–13

2010s
2010 UL Bohemians beat Young Munster 13–6
2011 Cashel beat Cork Constitution 23–20
2012 Cork Constitution beat Skibbereen 13–10
2013 Garryowen beat Cork Constitution 16–13
2014 Clonmel beat Clanwilliam 27–9
2015 Shannon beat Clonmel 33–19
2016 Young Munster beat Cork Constitution 22–13
2017 Bandon beat Young Munster 27–14
2018 Cork Constitution beat Richmond 21–15
2019 Highfield drew with Cork Constitution 23–23 (Highfield won on tries scored (3–1))

2020s
 2022 Young Munster beat Thomond 35-24

References

External sources
 The Carling Story of Munster Rugby by Charlie Mulqueen

Rugby union competitions in Munster
1909 establishments in Ireland